Qədılı (until 2008, Hadılı; also, Qadılı, and Kadyly) is a village and the least populous municipality in the Samukh Rayon of Azerbaijan.  It has a population of 328.

References 

Populated places in Samukh District